Malus'' 'Hopa', occasionally known as Hopa flowering crabapple, is a hybrid cultivar in the genus Malus'', in the family Rosaceae. It was created by Niels Ebbesen Hansen.

Sensitive to Juglone

References

Apple cultivars
Crabapples
Ornamental trees